Tennessee Christmas is the nineteenth studio album and fourth solo Christmas album by American contemporary Christian music singer and songwriter Amy Grant. It was released on October 21, 2016 on Capitol and Sparrow Records. The album is a collection of new recordings, Christmas song favorites, a re-recording of the album title track (originally released on Grant's A Christmas Album in 1983) and a duet with her husband Vince Gill.

Track listing

Personnel 
 Amy Grant – vocals, harmony vocals (13)
 Charlie Judge – keyboards (1, 2, 5, 8, 10, 13)
 Mac McAnally – keyboards (1, 2, 5, 8, 10, 13), guitars (1, 2, 5, 8, 10, 13), mandolins (1, 2, 5, 8, 10, 13), harmony vocals (13)
 Tim Lauer – keyboards (3, 4, 6, 15), acoustic piano (3, 4, 6, 15), organ (3, 4, 6, 15), Mellotron (3, 4, 6, 15), accordion (3, 4, 6, 15)
 Jason Webb – acoustic piano (7, 9, 11, 12, 14)
 Rob McNelley – guitars (1, 2, 5, 8, 10, 13), electric guitar (3, 4, 6)
 Gabe Scott – acoustic guitar (3, 4, 6, 15)
 Vince Gill – guitar solo (6), lead vocals (9), harmony vocals (13)
 Ed Cash – acoustic guitar (7, 9, 11, 12, 14)
 Nathan Dugger – electric guitar (7, 9, 11, 12, 14)
 Mike Brignardello – bass (1, 2, 5, 8, 10, 13)
 Mark Hill – bass (3, 4, 6, 15)
 Matt Pierson – bass (7, 9, 11, 12, 14)
 Greg Morrow – drums (1, 2, 5, 8, 10, 13)
 Jerry Roe – drums (3, 4, 6, 15)
 Eric Darken – percussion (1, 2, 5, 8, 10, 13)
 Corrina Gill – backing vocals (3, 10), harmony vocals (13)
 Jenny Gill – backing vocals (3, 10), harmony vocals (13)
 Sarah Chapman – backing vocals (10), harmony vocals (13)
 Hailey Darkwa – harmony vocals (13)
 Lenny LeBlanc – harmony vocals (13)
 Rachel Robinson – harmony vocals (13)

Production 
 Peter York – executive producer 
 Mac McAnally – producer (1, 2, 5, 8, 10, 13)
 Marshall Altman – producer (3, 4, 6, 15), vocal recording (3, 4, 6, 15)
 Ed Cash – producer (7, 9, 11, 12, 14)
 Chris Stone – engineer (1, 2, 5, 8, 10, 13), mixing (1, 5, 8, 10, 13)
 Craig Alvin – recording (3, 4, 6, 15), mixing (3, 4, 6, 15)
 Drew Bollman – engineer (7, 9, 11, 12, 14), editing (7, 9, 11, 12, 14)
 Matt Rausch – additional recording (1, 2, 5, 8, 10, 13), assistant engineer (1, 2, 5, 7-14), recording (3, 4, 6, 15), editing (7, 9, 11, 12, 14)
 Kyle Lehning – mixing (2)
 Sean Moffitt – mixing (7, 9, 11, 12, 14)
 Warren David – mix assistant (7, 9, 11, 12, 14)
 Andrew Mendelson – mastering 
 Angela Talley – production assistant (3, 4, 6)
 Becca Wildsmith – art direction, design 
 Russ Harrington – photography 
 Sheila Davis – hair, make-up
 Trish Townsend – wardrobe stylist 
 Phyllis Mayfield – set design

Studios
 Recorded at The House (Nashville, Tennessee).
 Additional recording and mixing on Tracks 1, 2, 5, 8, 10 & 13 at La La Land (Muscle Shoals, Alabama) and La La Land Nashville.
 Vocals on Tracks 3, 4, 6 & 15 recorded at The Galt Line (Nashville, Tennessee).
 Mixed at La La Land Nashville, The Compound, The Great Gazoo Reading Room and Yoda's Palace Studios (Nashville, Tennessee).
 Mastered at Georgetown Masters (Nashville, Tennessee).

Charts

References

2016 Christmas albums
Albums produced by Mac McAnally
Albums produced by Marshall Altman
Amy Grant albums
Capitol Records Christmas albums
Christmas albums by American artists
Pop Christmas albums
Sparrow Records albums